Bunduki is a 1975 novel byEnglish writer  J. T. Edson, the first work in the Bunduki series that followed. The series involves characters related to Tarzan and was initially authorized by the estate of Edgar Rice Burroughs. In the opening of the novel the main protagonists are transported from Earth to Zillikian (see below).

Novels and short stories
All of Edson's Bunduki stories were published in England by Corgi Books:
 
 
 
 
 Amazons of Zillikian (unpublished)

Short story prequels (set on Earth)
 "The Mchawi's Powers" – 
 "Death to Simba Nyeuse" – 
 "Accident – or Murder?" – 
 "A Good Time Was Had by All" –

Publication
The first three novels were published with permission from both Edgar Rice Burroughs, Inc. and Philip José Farmer for the biographical connections between Edson's Bunduki & Dawn, Burroughs' Tarzan characters, and Farmer's Wold Newton family.

Sometime after 1976, ERB Inc. withdrew Edson's permission to use the Tarzan name in future volumes and as a result, the fourth novel and the short stories do not mention Tarzan or Jane by name.

Zillikian
The planet is very similar to Earth in climate and wildlife, albeit without the industrialization of humans that Earth has.

See also

 Tarzan Alive: A Definitive Biography of Lord Greystoke
 Tarzan (book series)

References

External links 

 

1975 American novels
Tarzan characters
Characters in fantasy literature
Corgi books
Wold Newton family